Bindiya is a Pakistani actress and singer. She is known for her roles in dramas Noor Bano, Nadamat, Samundar, Thakan and Meri Behan Maya and she also acted in Urdu and Punjabi films Begum Jan, Awaz, Pakeeza, Behan Bhai, Ak Din Bahu Ka and Joora. She is one most popular actresses of her time and was one of the most successful actresses of the 1970s, 1980s and 1990s.

Early life
Bindiya was born in 1960 in Lahore, Pakistan. She completed her studies from University of Lahore.

Career
Bindiya started working as an English newscaster on PTV and later she made her debut as an actress in drama Jhok Siyal. Then she appeared in dramas Chattan Par Ghonsala, Samundar, Din and Aik Din. She also appeared in dramas Drama 83, Andhera Ujala, Status and Footpath Ki Ghaas. In late 1980s she worked in theatre with Murtaza Hassan. Then she worked in films both Urdu and Punjabi including Khan Baloch, Begum Jan, Awaz, Pakeeza, Behan Bhai, Ak Din Bahu Ka, Joora and Aahat. Since then she appeared in dramas Meri Behan Maya, Noor Bano, Nadamat and Takkay Ki Ayegi Baraat.

Personal life
Bindiya first married Muhammad Al-khumaish a pilot from Jordan in 1980s but later she divorced him and took the custoday of her only son Jahanzeb. Then she married actor Asad Nazir after one-and-half years she divorced him. In 2013 she married Zafar Ibrahim. Bindiya's sister Meena Pervaiz was also a newscaster and her niece Vaneeza Ahmed is an actress and singer.

Filmography

Television

Film

Awards and nominations

References

External links
 
 Film and TV actress Bindiya

1960 births
20th-century Pakistani women singers
Actresses in Punjabi cinema
Living people
20th-century Pakistani actresses
Urdu-language singers
Actresses in Pashto cinema
21st-century Pakistani actresses
Pakistani television actresses
Pakistani film actresses
Actresses in Urdu cinema
Pakistani women singers
21st-century Pakistani women singers
Pakistani television newsreaders and news presenters
Punjabi people
Punjabi-language singers
Actresses from Lahore